Akshaye Khanna (born 28 March 1975) is an Indian actor who appears in Hindi films. He is the son of actor Vinod Khanna. He has won numerous awards in his career including two Filmfare Awards, three Screen Awards and two IIFA Awards in varied acting categories.

After studying in Kishore Namit Kapoor Acting Institute in Mumbai, he made his acting debut in 1997 with the film Himalay Putra. His next release, J. P. Dutta's war drama Border (1997) emerged as a critical and commercial success, earning him the Filmfare Award for Best Male Debut and a Filmfare Award for Best Supporting Actor nomination.

Khanna rose to prominence with starring roles in the musical romantic drama Taal (1999), the comedy drama Dil Chahta Hai (2001) which won him a Best Supporting Actor at Filmfare, the romantic thriller Humraaz (2002), for which he was nominated in the Best Negative Role category, the romantic comedies Hungama (2003) and Hulchul (2004), the murder mystery 36 China Town (2006), the action thriller Race (2008) and the heist comedy Tees Maar Khan (2010), and he also acted in the comedy film No Problem (2010) and he continued to draw praise for his performances in the 1999 romance Dahek, the 2002 psychological thriller Deewangee, the 2007 biographical drama Gandhi, My Father and the 2010 action thriller film Aakrosh.

Following a 4-year hiatus since his last release, Gali Gali Chor Hai (2012), Khanna made his comeback with moderately successful films, as the antagonist in the action-comedy film Dishoom and as an investigative cop in two thrillers, the crime film Mom and the murder mystery Ittefaq (both 2017). Khanna received further acclaim for his role in Section 375 (2019) and Drishyam 2 (2022).

Early and personal life 
Akshaye Khanna was born on 28 March 1975 as the second son of Hindi actor and politician Vinod Khanna (1946-2017).

His mother Geetanjali Taleyarkhan was born into a Parsi family of lawyers and businessmen, she passed away in 2018.

He is the younger brother of actor Rahul Khanna.

He attended Bombay International School, Babulnath. He then did his 11th & 12th from Lawrence School, Lovedale, Ooty. In an interview, he said that he was better at sports than studies.

Career

Debut, career struggles, and breakthrough (1997–99) 
Khanna made his acting debut with Pankaj Parashar's romantic drama Himalay Putra (1997), co-starring his father Vinod, Hema Malini, Satish Shah, Johny Lever, Danny Denzongpa, and Amrish Puri. His performance earned him a Screen Award for Best Male Debut, but the film underperformed at the box office despite mostly positive reviews. 
 
Later that year, Khanna starred in J. P. Dutta's war drama Border alongside Sunny Deol, Suniel Shetty, and Jackie Shroff. Set during the Indo-Pakistani War of 1971, the film was about the events of the Battle of Longewala and saw Khanna play the real-life role of Dharamvir Singh Bhan, a commander who is also a part of the battle. The film generated positive reviews and eventually proved to be the second highest-grossing Bollywood film of 1997. Border won 4 Filmfare Awards, including a Best Male Debut trophy for Khanna, in addition to a Best Supporting Actor nomination at the same ceremony.

Khanna's final release of 1997 was the romance Mohabbat, in which he starred alongside Madhuri Dixit and Sanjay Kapoor. The film received negative critical reception and was commercially unsuccessful.

The following year, Khanna starred opposite Jyothika in Priyadarshan's romantic drama Doli Saja Ke Rakhna (1998), in which he portrayed a rich person who falls in love with Jyota's character. In the same year, Khanna starred opposite Urmila Matondkar in Raj N. Sippy's drama Kudrat.

Khanna's first release of 1999 came opposite Aishwarya Rai in Rishi Kapoor's directorial debut—the musical romance Aa Ab Laut Chalen. It was a below average in India but performed well at the overseas. His next film appearance was in Shrikant Sharma's romance Laawaris opposite Manisha Koirala. The film received positive reviews, but fared poorly at the box office.

Khanna next starred opposite Aishwarya Rai and Anil Kapoor in Subhash Ghai's musical romantic drama Taal, in which he played Manav Mehta, the son of a wealthy rich man who falls in love with a poor aspiring singer played by Rai. The film was highly anticipated by critics and proved to be the third highest-earning feature film of 1999, becoming his first commercial success since Border. Khanna's final film that year was Lateef Binnu's star-crossed romance Dahek in which he featured opposite Sonali Bendre as a Hindu boy who falls in love with a Muslim girl played by Bendre. The film proved to be a box office disappointment.

Critical recognition (2001–02) 

After a two-year absence from full-time acting, Khanna appeared in Farhan Akhtar's coming-of-age comedy-drama Dil Chahta Hai (2001) alongside Aamir Khan, Saif Ali Khan, Preity Zinta, Sonali Kulkarni and Dimple Kapadia. Set in Mumbai, it focuses on a major period of transition in the lives of three young friends. Khanna featured as one of the friends named Siddharth Sinha, a quiet and reticent boy. The feature generated highly positive reviews, with critical acclaim directed to the three leads' performances, and emerged as a major commercial success. Dil Chahta Hai won the National Film Award for Best Feature Film in Hindi and seven Filmfare Awards, including a Best Supporting Actor trophy for Khanna.

Abbas–Mustan's romantic thriller Humraaz (2002), co-starring Bobby Deol and Ameesha Patel, was Khanna's next film release. He played the main antagonist Karan Malhotra, a convincing con-artist whose girlfriend (played by Patel) marries a rich man (played by Deol) to secure his wealth, but eventually falls in love with him. Humraaz proved to be a major commercial success, and Khanna's performance drew critical praise. He won the IIFA Award for Best Performance in a Negative Role and received a nomination for the Filmfare Award for Best Performance in a Negative Role. That year, he also starred as a lawyer in Anees Bazmee's thriller Deewangee alongside Ajay Devgn and Urmila Matondkar, a financial failure for which he was nominated for the Screen Award for Best Actor.

Expansion into romantic comedies (2003–04) 
In 2003, Khanna starred as an electronic salesman in Priyadarshan's romantic comedy Hungama, co-starring Rimi Sen, Paresh Rawal, and Aftab Shivdasani. The feature became a box office hit with earnings of  despite a mixed critical reception. He next reunited with J. P. Dutta to film LOC Kargil, a war drama based on the events of the Kargil War fought between India and Pakistan. Khanna played the real-life character of Balwan Singh, an Indian army officer who is a part of the war.

Khanna's first release of 2004 was Milan Luthria's action thriller Deewaar, in which he played Gaurav Kaul, the son of an Indian army officer who sets out on a journey to find his missing father. Co-starring Amitabh Bachchan, Amrita Rao, and Sanjay Dutt, it received critical acclaim but failed to fare well at the box office.

In the same year, Khanna reteamed with Priyadarshan in the romantic comedy Hulchul, in which he was paired opposite Kareena Kapoor. The film proved to be a box-office hit.

Career decline (2006–07) 
After a year-long absence, Khanna appeared in three films in 2006—the first of which was Satish Kaushik's comedy-drama Shaadi Se Pehle, co-starring Suniel Shetty, Aftab Shivdasani, Ayesha Takia and Mallika Sherawat. Khanna's next role was in 36 China Town, a murder-mystery comedy adapted from the American film Once Upon a Crime and co-starring Kareena Kapoor and Shahid Kapoor. Directed by Abbas–Mustan, the film featured him as a police officer, and proved to be a financial success with earnings of over  worldwide.

Khanna's final film release that year was Dharmesh Darshan's romantic comedy Aap Ki Khatir alongside Priyanka Chopra, Ameesha Patel, Suniel Shetty, and Anupam Kher. It proved to be one of the year's biggest flops.

In 2007, Akshaye Khanna acted in Nikkhil Advani's ensemble drama Salaam-e-Ishq: A Tribute to Love, a romantic comedy consisting of six chapters. He was featured in the first and second chapter opposite Ayesha Takia. The film received negative reviews from critics and emerged as a major commercial disappointment.

His next appearance was in Abbas–Mustan's love-saga Naqaab, in which he starred as Vicky Malhotra, an unemployed film personality, alongside Bobby Deol and Urvashi Sharma. The feature received positive reviews from audiences but turned out to be an average grosser.
Khanna then took a leading role in Feroz Abbas Khan's adaptation of the novel Mahatma vs Gandhi, entitled Gandhi, My Father, co-starring Darshan Jariwala, Bhumika Chawla, and Shefali Shah. The feature explores the relationship between freedom fighter Mahatma Gandhi (played by Jariwala) and his eldest son Harilal Gandhi (played by Khanna). Though the film underperformed at the box office, his performance was praised, with several critics regarding it as one of his finest performances, and earned him a second Best Actor nomination at Screen Awards.

In his final release of that year, Khanna teamed with Anil Mehta for the dance film Aaja Nachle, co-starring Madhuri Dixit, Konkona Sen Sharma, Kunal Kapoor, and Jugal Hansraj, which underperformed at the box office.

Establishing, other setbacks, and sabbatical (2008–12) 
Khanna's performance in the Abbas–Mustan-directed action thriller Race (2008) marked a turning point in his career. Cast alongside Saif Ali Khan, Anil Kapoor, Katrina Kaif, and Bipasha Basu, Khanna garnered praise for his portrayal of the main antagonist Rajiv Singh, an alcoholic person who plots to kill his half brother (played by Khan) to secure his wealth. The success of the film established Khanna as one of the reliable actors of the Hindi film industry. For his final release of 2008, he reunited with Priyadarshan in the comedy Mere Baap Pehle Aap, co-starring Paresh Rawal, Genelia D'Souza, and Archana Puran Singh.

Khanna's only release in 2009 was Neeraj Vora's romantic comedy Shortkut, in which he starred alongside Amrita Rao and Arshad Warsi, playing the character of Shekhar, an assistant director who hopes to be a writer and director too. The feature garnered negative reviews from critics and bombed at the box office. The following year, he featured in three commercial failures—the first of which was Priyadarshan's action thriller Aakrosh. The film (co-starring Ajay Devgn, Paresh Rawal, Bipasha Basu, and Reemma Sen) featured Khanna as a CBI officer. He next appeared in Anees Bazmee's comedy No Problem, co-starring Anil Kapoor, Paresh Rawal, Kangana Ranaut, Sanjay Dutt, and Sushmita Sen. Khanna's final film of that year was Tees Maar Khan, a slapstick comedy directed by Farah Khan and co-starring Akshay Kumar and Katrina Kaif. Khanna's role was that of a popular but greedy actor. The film was a semi-hit. at the box office, his performance earned him a nomination for the Zee Cine Award for Best Actor in a Supporting Role – Male.

In 2012, Khanna starred in Gali Gali Chor Hai, an ensemble romantic comedy directed by Rumi Jaffrey and co-starring Shriya Saran and Mugdha Godse. It saw him portray the main protagonist Bharat Narayan, a simple kind-hearted person. Despite hype, Gali Gali Mein Chor Hai received mixed to negative reviews from critics and proved to be a major financial failure. Khanna then took a long sabbatical of four years from film acting.

Work after sabbatical, and critical acclaim (2016–present) 
Khanna made his comeback to Bollywood in 2016 with the action cop comedy Dishoom, in which he starred alongside Varun Dhawan, John Abraham, Jacqueline Fernandez, Saqib Saleem, and Tarun Khanna, playing the role of the main antagonist Wagah, a bookie who targets a top batsman (played by Saleem). The feature received mixed reviews from critics, but emerged as one of his most successful, earning over  worldwide.

Ravi Udayawar's crime thriller Mom was Khanna's first release of 2017. Co-starring with Sridevi, Nawazuddin Siddiqui, Sajal Ali, and Adnan Siddiqui, he received critical appreciation for his performance as Matthew, a CBI officer. The film narrated the story of a vigilante (played by Sridevi) who sets out to avenge the rape of her step-daughter (played by Ali). The feature garnered positive reviews from critics, with particular praise for Sridevi's performance. Later that year, he starred as an investigative cop in Abhay Chopra's murder-mystery Ittefaq—a remake of the 1969 film of the same name. Co-starring Sonakshi Sinha and Sidharth Malhotra, it proved to be an average grosser.

In 2019, Khanna starred in Section 375. His performance in the film gained him a nomination for the 65th Filmfare Award Best Actor Critics and a nomination for Best Actor Critics in Star Screen Awards also.

In 2021, ZEE5 roped in Khanna, to play the lead in State of Siege: Temple Attack. He played a special task force officer in the film.

In 2022, Khanna played a police officer in Drishyam 2. The film emerged as a critical and commercial success with Khanna receiving praise for his performance in the film.

Filmography

Awards and nominations

Filmfare Awards

Star Screen Awards

Won 
 1998: Best Male Debut for Himalay Putra
 2002: Special Jury Award for Dil Chahta Hai
 2009: Best Villain for Race

Nominations 
 1998: Best Supporting Actor for Border
 2002: Best Supporting Actor for Dil Chahta Hai
 2003: Best Actor for Deewangee
 2003: Best Villain for Humraaz
 2008: Best Actor for Gandhi, My Father
 2020: Best Actor (Critics) for Section 375

IIFA Awards

Won 
 2003: Best Villain for Humraaz
 2009: Best Villain for Race

Nominations 
 2002: Best Supporting Actor for Dil Chahta Hai

Zee Cine Awards

Won 

 1998 – Best Supporting Actor for Border – Won
 1998 – Best Male Debut for Border – Won

Nominations 

 2002 – Best Supporting Actor for Dil Chahta Hai
 2003 – Best Villain for Humraaz
 2011 – Best Supporting Actor for Tees Maar Khan
 2018 – Best Supporting Actor for Ittefaq

See also 
 List of Indian film actors
 List of Bollywood actors

References

External links 

 
 

1975 births
20th-century Indian male actors
21st-century Indian male actors
Filmfare Awards winners
Indian male film actors
Indian male voice actors
Screen Awards winners
Zee Cine Awards winners
International Indian Film Academy Awards winners
Living people
Male actors from Mumbai
Male actors in Hindi cinema
Parsi people
Punjabi people